Edward Piper (dates unknown) was an English organist.

Career
Piper was paid as Organist in the 1560-1 accounts of the Chichester Cathedral treasury. He was also a Lay Vicar in the cathedral and was appointed Master of the Choristers in 1562. His short tenure as Organist was to fill a one year interim role for Thomas Coring, who resumed his position in 1561.

See also
 Organs and organists of Chichester Cathedral

References

Cathedral organists
Year of birth missing
Year of death missing
English organists
British male organists
Male classical organists